Sheila Bhatia (1916-2008) was an Indian poet, playwright, theatre personality and the founder of the Delhi Art Theatre, a forum based in Delhi for the promotion of Indian art forms. She is credited with originating Punjabi opera, an Indian form of dance drama incorporating operatic movements. She was honoured by the Government of India in 1971 with Padma Shri, the fourth highest Indian civilian award. A decade later, she received the Sangeet Natak Akademi Award for theatre direction in 1982 followed by Kalidas Samman in 1997.

Biography
Sheila Bhatia was born on 1 March 1916 in Sialkot in British India, in present day Pakistan. After securing a BA degree, she graduated in education (BT) and started working as a teacher of mathematics in Lahore, involving herself with the Indian freedom struggle. Later she moved to Delhi where she founded the Delhi Art Theatre. She also worked with the National School of Drama as the head of the acting department.

Bhatia's debut production was Call of the Valley, a musical. That was followed by over 60 productions, such as Heer Ranjha (1957), Dard Aayega Dabe Paon (1979), Sulgada Darya (1982), Omar Khayyam (1990), Naseeb (1997), Chann Badla Da, Loha Kutt, Ghalib Kaun tha and Nadir Shah in Punabi and Qissa yeh aurat ka (1972), Hawa se hippy tak (1972), and Yeh ishq nahin asan (1980) in Urdu. A follower of Faiz Ahmed Faiz, Bhatia also has 10 publications to her credit including the poetry anthology, Parlo Da Jhakkarh (1950).

Awards 
The Government of India awarded her the civilian honour of Padma Shri in 1971. She received the Sangeet Natak Akademi Award for  best direction in 1982. The next year, she was awarded the Ghalib Award (1983) followed by Punjabi Arts Council award. She received the best director award from the Delhi Administration in 1986 and the Kalidas Samman in 1997. She was also a recipient of Urdu Academy Award and the Param Sahit Sarkar Sanman by the Punjabi Academy (2000).

Death 
Sheila Bhatia died on 17 February 2008 at the age of 91.

See also

 National School of Drama

References

Further reading
 
 

Recipients of the Padma Shri in literature & education
1916 births
2008 deaths
People from Sialkot
Indian women dramatists and playwrights
Indian theatre directors
Indian theatre managers and producers
Recipients of the Sangeet Natak Akademi Award
20th-century Indian poets
20th-century Indian dramatists and playwrights
Indian women poets
Indian women theatre directors
20th-century Indian women writers
20th-century Indian businesswomen
20th-century Indian businesspeople
Dramatists and playwrights from Punjab, India
Poets from Punjab, India
Women writers from Punjab, India
Businesswomen from Punjab, India
Businesspeople from Punjab, India